Rudeness is a 1975 film directed by Marino Girolami.

Cast

Production
Following the release of The Godfather, films about the mafia in Italy were struggling with their earlier commercial appeal basically having vanished. This led to later day films, such as Rudeness being overtly focused on sex.

Rudeness was shot at Incir-de Paolis Studios in Rome and on location in Palermo and Paris. Most of the film was shot in studios and included a lot of stock footage of streets and airports.

Release
Rudeness was distributed theatrically by Film Audax in Italy on May 11, 1975, with a 105-minute running time.

References

Footnotes

Sources

External links

1970s Italian-language films
Poliziotteschi films
1975 crime drama films
Films directed by Marino Girolami
Films shot in Paris
Films shot in Rome
1975 films
1970s Italian films